Westerfield is a village in Suffolk, England

Westerfield may also refer to:

Places
Westerfield railway station, railway station in Westerfield, England
Westerfield, New Zealand, in Ashburton District
Westerfield, Shetland, coastal community in Scotland

People
David Westerfield (born 1952), American murderer convicted of killing Danielle van Dam in 2002
Dena Westerfield (born 1971), American bodybuilder
H. Bradford Westerfield (1928-2008), Italian professor
James Westerfield (1913-1971), American actor
Ken Westerfield (born 1947), American frisbee disc player
Louis Westerfield (1949-1996), American lawyer
Richard Westerfield, American conductor
Samuel Z. Westerfield Jr. (1919-1972), American foreign services officer
Whitney Westerfield (born 1980), American politician

Other
Westervelt massacre (also known as the Westerfield massacre), a 1780 indigenous attack on Dutch frontier settlers in Kentucky

See also
Westerfeld
Westerveld
Westerveld (surname)